The Christian Democratic Alliance was a minor political party in South Africa, an alliance of five Christian Democratic parties: the Alliance for Community Transformation, the Christian Democratic Party, the Federation of Democrats, the New Labour Party, and the Party vir Christelike Politiek (Party for Christian Politics). These parties continued as independent entities until the 2009 election.

The party failed to win any seats in the 2009 general election and subsequently dissolved itself.

Election results

References

External links
Christian Democratic Alliance Official Site

Christian democratic parties in South Africa
Christian political parties in South Africa
Conservative parties in South Africa
Defunct political parties in South Africa
Political parties disestablished in 2009